Glenn Roger Mickens (July 26, 1930 – July 9, 2019) was a pitcher in Major League Baseball. He pitched in four games (two of which were starts) for the 1953 Brooklyn Dodgers. He also played for five years in Japan, from 1959 until 1963 for the Kintetsu Buffaloes. There, he compiled a record of 45–53 with a 2.54 ERA.

After his playing career, Mickens became a baseball coach at UCLA for many years.

Mickens died on July 9, 2019, from pneumonia,  weeks before his 89th birthday.

See also 
 American expatriate baseball players in Japan

References

External links
, or Pura Pelota

1930 births
2019 deaths
People from Los Angeles County, California
American expatriate baseball players in Japan
Baseball players from California
Billings Mustangs players
Brooklyn Dodgers players
Fort Worth Cats players
Los Angeles Angels (minor league) players
Kintetsu Buffaloes players
Major League Baseball pitchers
Montreal Royals players
Navegantes del Magallanes players
American expatriate baseball players in Venezuela
St. Paul Saints (AA) players
UCLA Bruins baseball coaches
UCLA Bruins baseball players
Victoria Rosebuds players
John C. Fremont High School alumni
Deaths from pneumonia in Hawaii